Landslip Island is an island of the Arctic Archipelago in the territory of Nunavut. It lies at the mouth of Harbour Fiord on the Jones Sound, south of Ellesmere Island.

External links 
 Landslip Island in the Atlas of Canada - Toporama; Natural Resources Canada

Uninhabited islands of Qikiqtaaluk Region